Royal Consort Deok-bi of the Jo clan (Hangul: 덕비 조씨) was a consort of King U, the 32nd monarch of the Goryeo dynasty of Korea.

References

 

14th-century births
14th-century deaths
Royal consorts of the Goryeo Dynasty
14th-century Korean women